In music, Op. 126 stands for Opus number 126. Compositions that are assigned this number include:

 Beethoven – Bagatelles, Op. 126
 Schumann – Seven Piano Pieces in Fughetta Form
 Shostakovich – Cello Concerto No. 2